"I Can't Go On" is a song recorded by Swedish singer Robin Bengtsson. The song was released as a digital download in Sweden on 26 February 2017 and peaked at number three on the Swedish Singles Chart. It won Melodifestivalen 2017 and represented Sweden in the Eurovision Song Contest 2017. The song is written by David Kreuger, Hamed "K-One" Pirouzpanah, and Robin Stjernberg.

Eurovision Song Contest

Bengtsson was announced to be taking part in Melodifestivalen 2017, Sweden's national final for the Eurovision Song Contest 2017, on 30 November 2016. He competed in the third semi-final on 18 February 2017 and qualified directly to the final. He won the final of Melodifestivalen on 11 March 2017, after placing first with the international juries and third with the Swedish public. Sweden opened the first semi-final at the Eurovision Song Contest. The song finished 5th with 344 points at the grand final, including 126 points from televote (8th place) and 218 points from the juries (3rd place).

Track listing

Credits and personnel
Robin Bengtsson – vocals
David Kreuger – songwriter, producer
Hamed Pirouzpanah – songwriter, producer
Robin Stjernberg – additional vocals, songwriter, keyboards, producer
Molly Pettersson Hammar – additional vocals
Petter Lindgård – trombone
Jens Lindgård – trumpet
Frank Nilsson – drums
Lars Norgren – mix, mastering

Credits adapted from Qobuz.com

Charts

Weekly charts

Year-end charts

Release history

References

Robin Bengtsson songs
2017 singles
2016 songs
Capitol Records singles
English-language Swedish songs
Melodifestivalen songs of 2017
Swedish pop songs
Eurovision songs of Sweden
Eurovision songs of 2017
Songs written by David Kreuger